Abu Abdallah Muhammad ibn Ahmad al-Mustazhir (9 April 1096 – 12 March 1160), better known by his regnal name al-Muqtafi li-Amr Allah, was the Abbasid caliph in Baghdad from 1136 to 1160, succeeding his nephew al-Rashid, who had been forced to abdicate by the Seljuks. The continued disunion and contests between Seljuk Turks afforded al-Muqtafi opportunity of not only maintaining his authority in Baghdad, but also extending it throughout Iraq.

Birth and background
The future caliph al-Muqtafi was born on 9 April 1096 as Abu Abdallah Muhammad, the son of the Abbasid caliph al-Mustazhir. His mother was Ashin, a slave girl from Syria. After his father's death his half-brother al-Mustarshid succeeded him on 6 August 1118. Al-Mustarshid (r. 1118–1135) ruled for sixteen years as Caliph but the last three years of his reign were occupied with war against Seljuq sultan Mas'ud (his deputy). Not long after the siege of Damascus, al-Mustarshid launched a military campaign against Seljuk sultan Mas'ud, who had obtained the title in Baghdad in January 1133 by the caliph himself. The rival armies met near Hamadan.  The caliph, deserted by his troops, was taken prisoner, and pardoned on the promising not to quit his palace. Left in the caliphal tent, however, in the sultan's absence, he was found murdered while reading the Quran, as is supposed, by an emissary of the Assassins, who had no love for the caliph.  Modern historians have suspected that Mas'ud instigated the murder although the two most important historians of the period Ibn al-Athir and Ibn al-Jawzi did not speculate on this matter. Physically, al-Mustarshid was a red-haired man with blue eyes and freckles.

Al-Mustarshid was succeeded by his son and heir apparent, Al-Rashid Billah on 29 August 1135. Like his father al-Mustarshid, al-Rashid Billah made another attempt of military independence (forming his own military) from the Seljuks. To avenge his father's death, he insulted the envoy of sultan Ghiyath ad-Din Mas'ud who came to demand a heavy largess, incited the mob to plunder his palace, and then, supported by Zengi, who was equally hostile to the sultan because of the murder of Dubais ibn Sadaqah, set up a rival sultan. Mas'ud hastened to the rebellious capital and laid siege to it. Baghdad, well defended by the river and its canals, resisted the attack; but in the end the caliph and Zengi, hopeless of success, escaped to Mosul. The sultan's power restored, a council was held, the caliph deposed, and his uncle al-Muqtafi succeeded as the new caliph. Al-Rashid Bi'llah fled to Isfahan where he was assassinated by a team of four Nizari Ismailis (Assassins) in June 1138. This was celebrated in Alamut for a week.

Reign 
Al-Muqtafi was proclaimed caliph on 17 September 1136. He was able to use the infighting of the Seljuks to safeguard his own control over Baghdad, and even gradually extend his rule over much of Iraq. 

In 1148, he successfully fought off a group of Seljuk generals who rebelled against Sultan Mas'ud and marched on Baghdad. According to some sources, a similar attempt followed in the next year, and was likewise defeated by the caliph's troops. Following the death of Mas'ud in October 1152, and the ensuing contest for the sultanate among the Seljuks, al-Muqtfi played an active role. In the months after Mas'ud's death, he seized Wasit and al-Hilla. In the Seljuk succession struggle, he supported Mas'ud's brother, Suleiman-Shah, against Mas'ud's nephew, Muhammad II, extracting from the former a pledge not to interfere in Iraq. 

After Muhammad defeated Suleiman-Shah, however, the Seljuks marched on Baghdad and forced the caliph to take refuge in the eastern quarter, initiating the Seljuk siege of Baghdad of 1157. The siege was eventually abandoned as Muhammad faced the rebellion of Malik-Shah III in Hamadan, and over time al-Muqtafi restored good relations with Muhammad. During his last years, al-Muqtafi attacked Tikrit twice in vain, but captured the town of Lihf.

Awn al-Din ibn Hubayra was appointed as the vizier (minister) of the Caliph, a post he kept for sixteen years until his death on 27 March 1165, commonly attributed to poisoning through his physician, who was in the pay of his rivals. 

During his caliphate, the Crusades were raging and Zengi, the atabeg of Mosul and founder of Zengid dynasty, obtained high distinction as a brave and generous warrior. At one time hard pressed, Zengi made urgent appeal for help to Baghdad. The sultan and the caliph dispatched 20,000 men in response. But in reality neither the Seljuks, nor the caliph, nor their emirs, had any enthusiasm for war against the Crusaders.

Al-Muqtafi is praised by contemporary Muslim historians as virtuous, capable and brave. During his caliphate of twenty-five years, he conducted many minor expeditions against enemies throughout Iraq and Syria.

A charter of protection granted by al-Muqtafi in 1139 to the Nestorian patriarch Abdisho III was published in 1926 by the Assyrian scholar Alphonse Mingana.

Family
The daughter of Muhammad I Tapar and Nistandar Jahan was Fatimah Khatun. 

Fatimah married caliph Al-Muqtafi in 1137, and died in September 1147. Al-Muqtafi had several children, the most famous of them was Al-Mustanjid, who became his successor.

Kerman was the daughter of caliph Al-Muqtafi. She was wife of sultan Muhammad II They married towards the end of 1158 or in early 1159. He was, however, unable to consummate the marriage owing to his illness.

Another daughter was the wife of sultan Ghiyath ad-Din Mas'ud. They married in 1140. Her dowry was one hundred thousand dinars. The wedding procession was delayed for five years because of her young age. However, the marriage was never consummated because of Masud's ultimate death.

Death
Al-Muqtafi died on 12 March 1160 at the age 64. He was succeeded by his son Yusuf better known by his regnal name al-Mustanjid. He was born in 1124, he assumed the throne at the age of 36 after the death of his father al-Muqtafi.

See also 
 Abu Mansur Mauhub al-Jawaliqi, who served as imam for al-Muqtafi.
 Abd al-Latif al-Baghdadi

References

Sources 
 
  
 
 
 This text is adapted from William Muir's public domain, The Caliphate: Its Rise, Decline, and Fall.

1096 births
1160 deaths
12th-century Abbasid caliphs
Muslims of the Second Crusade
12th-century Arabic poets
Sons of Abbasid caliphs